Karin Huebner (born March 23, 1964) is an American historian and former professional tennis player.

A native of Fresno, California, Huebner was a collegiate tennis player for the UCLA Bruins in the early 1980s, before competing on the international tour. She qualified for her only grand slam singles main draw at the 1984 US Open and fell in the first round to Raffaella Reggi.

Huebner, who holds a PhD in history from the University of Southern California, works for her alma mater as the Director of Programs at the Harman Academy for Polymathic Study.

References

External links
 
 

1964 births
Living people
American female tennis players
UCLA Bruins women's tennis players
Tennis people from California
Sportspeople from Fresno, California
University of Southern California alumni
University of Southern California faculty